Glory By Honor XIII was the 13th Glory By Honor professional wrestling event produced by Ring of Honor (ROH). It took place on November 15, 2014 at the San Antonio Shrine Auditorium in San Antonio, Texas.

Background
Glory by Honor XIII featured seven professional wrestling matches, which involved different wrestlers from pre-existing scripted feuds, plots, and storylines that played out on ROH's television programs. Wrestlers portrayed villains or heroes as they followed a series of events that built tension and culminated in a wrestling match or series of matches.

Results

References

External links
Ring of Honor's official website

2014 in professional wrestling
Events in San Antonio
2014 in Texas
13
Professional wrestling in San Antonio